Scleria verticillata, known as low nutrush or whorled nutrush, is a plant in the sedge family Cyperaceae. It is native to Ontario, Canada, the eastern United States, The Bahamas, and Cuba.

Conservation status
It is listed as endangered in Maryland, New Jersey, New York (state), and in Pennsylvania. It is listed as threatened in Arkansas, Iowa, and Minnesota, and as a special concern in Tennessee. It is listed as a special concern and believed extirpated in Connecticut.

In Canada, it is only known from Ontario, where it is listed as an S3 species (Vulnerable).

References

verticillata
Flora of North America
Flora of South America